Eneid Kodra (born 4 November 1999) is an Albanian footballer who plays as a midfielder for Partizani Tirana in the Kategoria Superiore.

Career

Partizani Tirana
Kodra made his league debut for the club on 1 September 2018, coming on as a 70th-minute substitute for Jasir Asani in a 1–0 home victory over Kastrioti.

References

External links

FK Partizani Tirana players
Kategoria Superiore players
Association football midfielders
Footballers from Tirana
Albanian footballers
1999 births
Living people